Dominique Mollier (born 7 September 1949) is a French former freestyle swimmer. She competed in two events at the 1968 Summer Olympics.

References

External links
 

1949 births
Living people
French female freestyle swimmers
Olympic swimmers of France
Swimmers at the 1968 Summer Olympics
Sportspeople from Chambéry